The 1993 NCAA Division I Field Hockey Championship was the 13th women's collegiate field hockey tournament organized by the National Collegiate Athletic Association, to determine the top college field hockey team in the United States. The Maryland Terrapins won their second championship, defeating the North Carolina Tar Heels in the final The championship rounds were held at Bauer Field in Piscataway, New Jersey on the campus of Rutgers University.

Bracket

References 

1993
Field Hockey
1993 in women's field hockey
1993 in sports in New Jersey
Women's sports in New Jersey